Lengsin is a protein that in humans is encoded by the LGSN gene.

Lengsin is a survivor of an ancient family of class I glutamine synthetases in eukaryotes that has undergone evolutionary re-engineering for a tissue-specific, noncatalytic role in the lens of the vertebrate eye. Lengsin is the result of the recruitment of an ancient enzyme may act as a component of the cytoskeleton or as a chaperone for the reorganization of intermediate filament proteins during terminal differentiation in the lens. It does not seem to have enzymatic activity.

References

Further reading

External links 
 

Proteins